Vinstradalen valley is located in Oppdal municipality, Trøndelag county, Norway. Vinstradalen is a side valley to the valley of Drivdalen.

Vinstradal is a narrow V-shaped valley with steep valley sides and with a canyon in the valley's north end. The valley is covered by a mountain birch forest. Geologically, Vinstra valley consists mostly of rocks dating from the Cambrian, Ordovician and Silurian geologic period. There is considerable formation of alternately layered shale and limestone from the period, with some sandstone and mica.

Oppdal
Valleys of Trøndelag